The 1933–34 Cornell Big Red men's ice hockey season was the 27th season of play for the program. The teams was coached by Nick Bawlf in his 12th season.

Season
Cornell's ice hockey team returned after two years away. The club was only able to resolve its home ice situation for one game, having to play the other on the road. They opened against a fairly poor Colgate team in mid-February, however, Cornell had an almost completely green lineup and could only manage a 2–2 tie. A week later they played their second and last game of the season, falling to a much stronger Hamilton squad, 0–5. The only player who had any previous experience at the college level was Jack Draney, who had been on the last Cornell team in 1931.

Roster

Standings

Schedule and results

|-
!colspan=12 style=";" | Regular Season

Scoring statistics

References

Cornell Big Red men's ice hockey seasons
Cornell
Cornell
Cornell
Cornell